The 100 Block of West Broadway Historic District is a nationally recognized historic district located in Council Bluffs, Iowa, United States. It was listed on the National Register of Historic Places in 2002.  At the time of its nomination the district consisted of 30 resources, including 22 contributing buildings, and eight non-contributing buildings.  The linear district on the east side of the central business district is the north side of Broadway.  Developed between mid-1850s and 1928, it is the only section of the street that has maintained its historical integrity.  The buildings are one to three stories tall with commercial space on the main floor.  While many are vernacular commercial structures, others are the various revival styles of Victorian architecture.

References

Victorian architecture in Iowa
Mission Revival architecture in Iowa
Council Bluffs, Iowa
National Register of Historic Places in Pottawattamie County, Iowa
Historic districts in Pottawattamie County, Iowa
Historic districts on the National Register of Historic Places in Iowa